George Maledon (June 10, 1830 – June 5, 1911) was an American hangman aptly nicknamed "The Prince of Hangmen", who served in the federal court of Judge Isaac Parker.

Early life

Maledon was born on June 10, 1830, in Germany. His family migrated to Detroit, Michigan while he was still a child. He moved to Fort Smith, Arkansas soon after his 18th birthday, and began working as a police officer. He held this position for many years. At the outbreak of the Civil War, he enlisted in the Arkansas Light Artillery, serving in the 1st Battalion.

Career 
After the war's end, Maledon returned to Fort Smith, where he began working as a night guard in the Federal jail. Records indicate that Maledon supervised executions from the mid-1880s until 1891, and then again in 1894. Maledon carried dual revolvers around and who ever tried to escape was killed by his gun.  Maledon was not the only jailer who participated in the executions. Contemporary newspaper accounts mention other jailers as well.

In popular culture 
Remembered today as the "prince of Hangmen," George Maledon's actual work at Fort Smith is much more difficult to document. He stopped working for the federal court in 1894, and began traveling the area with a tent display showing gallows relics, including nooses and photographs of the men who died on the gallows. The 1899 publication of "Hell on the Border" documented Maledon's ties to the executions of the Federal Court, and first bestowed the title of "prince of hangmen."

Death 
In 1905, in failing health, Maledon entered an "Old Soldiers Home" in Humboldt, Tennessee. Maledon died in 1911, just shy of his 81st birthday, of natural causes. He is buried in the Johnson City Cemetery.

References

External links
George Maledon
 

1830 births
1911 deaths
American municipal police officers
American deputy sheriffs
People of the American Old West
People from Fort Smith, Arkansas
People from Detroit
American executioners
American people of German descent